Roger O'Shaughnessey or O'Shaughnessy may refer to:

 Sir Roger O'Shaughnessy, The O'Shaughnessy, Chief of the Name (died 1690)
Sir Roger O'Shaughnessy of Kinelea, Irish Knight, known in Gaeilge as Ruaidhrí Gilla Dubh Ó Seachnasaigh (died 1569)